Before the advent of the Open era of tennis competitions in April 1968, only amateurs were allowed to compete in established tournaments, including the four majors. There was no prize money and players were compensated for travel expenses only. However many top tennis players turned professional to play legally for prize money in the years before the open era. They played in separate professional events, mostly on tours involving head-to-head competition, but also in professional tournaments as the biggest events on the pro tour. Professional tournaments, in particular the professional majors, usually only had a men's draw.

Professional majors 
In addition to the head-to-head tours, there were also major pro events, where the world's top professional male players often played. These tournaments held with a certain tradition and longevity. According to Ellsworth Vines, "the Wembley tournament in London..., the U.S. professional championship, and to some extent the tournament in Paris were the major professional tournaments prior to 1968."

The oldest of these three tournaments was the U.S. Pro Tennis Championships, played at a variety of different venues and on a variety of different surfaces, between 1927 and 1999. The Wembley Championship, played between 1934 and 1990 at the Wembley Arena in the United Kingdom, was played on a wood surface through 1967. The third professional major was the French Pro Championship, where between 1930 and 1968 it was played on both clay and wood courts. A player who won all three in a calendar year was considered in retrospect by later tennis writers to achieve a "Professional Grand Slam", or "Pro Slam".

In some years, professional tournaments other than the pro majors had stronger fields and offered more prize money. Jack Kramer designated the four major professional tournaments for the 1958/1959 seasons as follows; Forest Hills, Kooyong, L.A. Masters, Sydney.

U.S. Pro Tennis Championships

The U.S. Pro Tennis Championship, also known as the US Pro, and officially known as the Cleveland International Pro or Cleveland World Pro Tennis Championships between 1951 and 1962, was an annual tournament, later known as MFS Pro Championships. It was first organized by player Vincent Richards when promoter C. C. Pyle withdrew interest in the project.  It was first played on the Notlek courts located at 119th Street and Riverside Drive, Manhattan. The tournament was held at various locations in several states until 1964, when it moved to the Longwood Cricket Club in Chestnut Hill, Massachusetts. In both 1951 and 1954 there are two U.S. Pro tournaments listed here for each year.

French Pro Championship

The French Pro Championship was first held in 1930, held by the "Association Française des Professeurs de Tennis (AFPT)", entitled "Championnat International de France Professionnel" (French Pro Championships) on June 18–22, 1930.  From 1930 the French Pro Championship was always played at Paris, on outdoor clay at Roland Garros except from 1963 to 1967 where it was held at Stade Pierre de Coubertin on indoor wood.

Wembley Championship

The Wembley Championship, also known as the Wembley Pro, was held at the Wembley Arena, in London. This professional event ran from 1934 to 1967 and was originally played on a wood surface placed over the top of a drained pool. It was officially known as the "London Indoor Professional Championships" from 1951 through 1967.

List of professional major champions

Singles

Doubles 

Source:

Other important tournaments
The Championships at Wimbledon, the U.S. Championships, the French Championships, and the Australian Championships were typically the top events, where amateur players could compete for the title, albeit without prize money. Since the professional circuit was less organized and somewhat less popular than the amateur circuit, the professional events hierarchy changed each year. In 1934 the U.S. Pro was a high-class tournament with all top ranked pro players whereas in 1936 it was a meeting between pro teachers without any leading pro players. A tournament could even be canceled at any time due to poor attendance.

Consequently, for a given year a pro tournament was important when it attracted the best pro players and then another year this same tournament could be a second-rank tournament because few or no leading players came. Before the open era in addition to numerous small tournaments and head-to-head tours between the leading professionals, there were some major tournaments which stood out at different periods. Some survived sporadically because of financial collapses while others temporarily rose to the highest levels of competition when other tournaments weren't held. These include:

Bristol Cup: 1920–1932

Sometimes labelled "Professional Championships of France" this tournament was held on the French Riviera at Menton, at Cannes.

Professional Championship of the World: 1927–1928

This event was held in October on clay courts, at the Queen's Club in London. In 1928 Myers of the Daily Telegraph wrote that "this was the best pro tournament ever held in England."

List of Queen's Club Pro winners:

World Pro Championship: 1932–1933

The World Pro Championship were held in 1932 and 1933 in Berlin at the Rot-Weiss club, on clay. It had a very large participation (over 80 players). According to Ray Bowers, the tournament at the time was regarded as the most prestigious professional tournament in the world.

List of World Pro winners:

Bonnardel Cup: 1935–1937
This was a team tournament created by Bill Tilden and modeled on the Davis Cup format. In 1935, early rounds in France were hoped to be played at Roland Garros, but the French Tennis Association would not allow the event to be played at the stadium.

International Pro Championship of Britain: 1935–1939

The International Pro Championship of Britain (also known as the Southport Pro, as well as the Southport Dunlop Cup for sponsorship purposes) was a professional tennis tournament held at Victoria Park in Southport between 1935 and 1939. It was open to professional players only, amateurs were not allowed to compete. The tournament was held on outdoor En-tout-cas, "all-weather" artificial clay.

List of International Pro Championship of Britain winners:

U.S. Pro Hard Courts: 1945–1946
In LA; the only significant pro tournament of the last year of World War II, although missing Frank Kovacs and Welby Van Horn.

Philadelphia U.S. Pro Indoor: 1950–1952

Australian Pro: 1954

The Australian Pro was a men's professional tournament held in 1954 and it was billed as the Australian Professional Championships.

Tournament of Champions: 1957–1959

The Tournament of Champions was a prominent professional tennis tournament series between 1957 and 1959. The tournament was held on the grass-courts of Forest Hills, New York, between 1957 and 1959, and an Australian version of the Tournament of Champions was held on grass at White City, Sydney in 1957 and 1959, and at Kooyong Stadium in Melbourne in 1958. The 1957 and 1958 Forest Hills tournaments had a round robin format, while the 1959 Forest Hills was an elimination tournament with 10 players. The Sydney version was an elimination event, while the 1958 Kooyong event was a round robin format.

The 1957 Forest Hills Tournament of Champions was broadcast live nationally in the U.S.A. on the CBS television network in its entirety, the only known professional tennis tournament in the U.S.A. to achieve this status before the Open Era. (The CBS Dallas pro tennis tournament in 1965 was filmed and broadcast one match at a time in a weekly series.) The 1959 Forest Hills Tournament of Champions offered the largest winners' cheques of the year. The current designation by the West Side Tennis Club of the 1957–59 Forest Hills TOC is "WCT Tournament of Champions". Kramer's contemporary brochures described the Ampol series, of which the 1959 Forest Hills TOC was a part, with the term "World Championship Tennis".

The 1958 Kooyong Tournament of Champions was the richest tournament of the series, with a prize money of 10,000 Australian pounds (US$24,000).

List of Tournament of Champions winners: Forest Hills

White City (Sydney) and Kooyong (Melbourne)

Masters Pro: 1956–1965

Round Robin in Los Angeles, held from 1956 to 1960, and again in 1964, 1965, and 1967.
The Ampol Masters Pro was held at White City in Sydney in 1958.

Masters Pro winners:

Kramer Cup: 1961–1963
A team format tournament.

Madison Square Garden Pro: 1966–1967

Madison Square Garden Pro winners:

Forest Hills Pro: 1966
The Forest Hills Pro was held in June 1966 on the grass courts of the West Side Tennis Club using the VASSS Scoring System.

Forest Hills Pro winner:

Wimbledon Pro: 1967

The Wimbledon World Professional Championship, also known as the Wimbledon Pro, was held in August 1967. It was first time that professional tennis players played on Centre Court at Wimbledon. The tournament was sponsored and broadcast by the BBC to mark the invention of colour television.

Wimbledon Pro winner:

References

Bibliography

External links
 History of the Pro Tennis Wars
 Chapter I: Suzanne Lenglen and the First Pro Tour
 Chapter II, Part 1: The eminence of Karel Kozeluh and Vincent Richards 1927–1928
 Chapter II, Part 2: Deja vu 1929–1930
 Chapter III: Tilden's Year of Triumph in 1931
 Chapter IV: Tilden and Nusslein, 1932–1933
 Chapter V: The Early Ascendancy of Vines, 1934
 Chapter VI: Vines's Second Year: 1935
 Chapter VII: Awaiting Perry, 1936
 Chapter VIII: Perry and Vines, 1937
 Chapter IX: Readying for Budge, 1938
 Chapter X: Budge's Great Pro Year, 1939
 Chapter XI: America, 1940–1941
 Chapter XI: America, 1942
 Chapter XII: The High War Years, 1943–1945

Tennis records and statistics
T